Katakura Dam is a gravity dam located in Chiba Prefecture in Japan. The dam is used for flood control and water supply. The catchment area of the dam is 18.6 km2. The dam impounds about 70  ha of land when full and can store 8410 thousand cubic meters of water. The construction of the dam was started on 1974 and completed in 2000.

References

Dams in Chiba Prefecture
2000 establishments in Japan